PT Foundation is a community-based, voluntary non-profit making organization providing HIV/AIDS education, prevention, care and support programmes, sexual health and empowerment programmes for vulnerable communities in Malaysia. PT Foundation is the largest community-based HIV/AIDS organization in Malaysia and has benefited more than 100,000 people.

PT Foundation was also one of the seven founding members of the Malaysian AIDS Council (MAC).

History
Pink Triangle Sdn Bhd was founded in 1987 to provide a telephone counseling service for HIV/AIDS and sexuality issues. It was founded to cater for gay men in Malaysia. The foundation started in a small room in an apartment on the 13th floor of City Tower in Jalan Alor, Kuala Lumpur before moving to Jalan Inai and finally to its current location at Jalan Ipoh Kecil. In 2000, PT Foundation was registered under the Register of Companies and took over the assets of Pink Triangle Sdn Bhd and was formally recognized as a Foundation in Malaysia. The foundation has evolved to provide support and care services to four other vulnerable communities: Maknyah (a Malay term for a male-to-female transgender people), commercial sex workers, drug users and people living with HIV.

PT Foundation is the first NGO in Malaysia to offer HIV/AIDS testing, counseling, prevention, support, referral and care services.  Being a member of the MSM community, Raymond Tai, the chief operating officer of PT Foundation firmly believes that the battle to eliminate stigma and discrimination of HIV/AIDS involved a shift in how soon Malaysia could move from a conservative and judgemental society to one that embraced diversity, irrespective of one's race, religion and sexual orientation.

Services
PT Foundation provides telephone and face-to-face counseling, anonymous HIV and STI screening, outreach programmes, and support for key affected populations mainly drug users, sex workers, transsexuals, men who have sex with men (MSM), and people living with HIV/AIDS (PLHIV).

Community Health Care Centre (CHCC)
CHCC is a centre located in Sentul, Kuala Lumpur. The centre is managed as a social enterprise, where beneficiaries of the programme e.g. the MSM community have to pay fees for HIV and other sexually-transmitted diseases tests and counselling services. The centre is accredited as an Impact Driven Enterprise by the Finance Ministry.

Awards and Accolades

See also

 HIV/AIDS in Malaysia
 LGBT rights in Malaysia

References

External links
 

Organizations established in 1987
Foundations based in Malaysia
Medical and health foundations
HIV/AIDS organizations
LGBT in Malaysia